The discography of Reef, an English psychedelic rock band, consists of six studio albums, four compilation albums, three live albums, one video album and nineteen singles.

Albums

Studio albums

Compilation albums

Live albums

Video albums

Singles

References

Discographies of British artists
Rock music group discographies